Mary Gaitskill (born November 11, 1954) is an American novelist, essayist, and short story writer. Her work has appeared in The New Yorker, Harper's Magazine, Esquire, The Best American Short Stories (1993, 2006, 2012, 2020), and The O. Henry Prize Stories (1998, 2008). Her books include the short story collection Bad Behavior (1988) and Veronica (2005), which was nominated for both the National Book Award for Fiction and the National Book Critics Circle Award for Fiction.

Life
Gaitskill was born in Lexington, Kentucky. She has lived in New York City, Toronto, San Francisco, Marin County and Pennsylvania, as well as attending the University of Michigan, where she earned her B.A. in 1981 and won a Hopwood Award. She sold flowers in San Francisco as a teenage runaway. In a conversation with novelist and short story writer Matthew Sharpe for BOMB Magazine, Gaitskill said she chose to become a writer at age 18 because she was "indignant about things—it was the typical teenage sense of 'things are wrong in the world and I must say something.'" Gaitskill has also recounted (in her essay "Revelation") becoming a born-again Christian at age 21 but lapsing after six months.

She married the writer Peter Trachtenberg in 2001. They divorced in 2010.

Gaitskill has taught at UC Berkeley, the University of Houston, New York University, The New School, Brown University, Syracuse University, and in the MFA program at Temple University. She has previously been a Writer-In-Residence at Hobart and William Smith Colleges and Baruch College. As of 2020, Gaitskill is a visiting professor of literature at Claremont McKenna College.

Works
Gaitskill attempted to find a publisher for four years before her first book, the short story collection Bad Behavior, was published in 1988. The first four stories are written in the third person point of view primarily from the perspectives of male characters (the 2nd story "A Romantic Weekend," is split between one male and one female character's point of view). The remaining five stories are written from the perspectives of female characters. Secretary is the only story in the book written in the first-person point of view. Several of the stories have themes of sexuality, romance, love, sex work, sadomasochism, drug addiction, being a writer in New York City, and living in New York City. A Romantic Weekend and Secretary both explore themes of BDSM and psychological aspects of dominance and submission in sexual relationships. The story Connection is about a female friendship.

Gaitskill's fiction is typically about female characters dealing with their own inner conflicts, and her subject matter matter-of-factly includes many "taboo" subjects such as prostitution, addiction, and sado-masochism.  Gaitskill says that she had worked as a stripper and call girl.  She showed similar candor in an essay about being raped, "On Not Being a Victim," for Harper's.

Gaitskill's 1994 essay in Harper's also addresses feminist debates about date rape, victimization, and responsibility. She describes ways that individual subjectivity influences all experiences, making it impossible to come to "universally agreed-upon conclusions."

The film Secretary (2002) is based on the short story of the same name in Bad Behavior, although the two have little in common.  She characterized the film as "the Pretty Woman version, heavy on the charm (and a little too nice)," but observed that the "bottom line is that if [a film adaptation is] made you get some money and exposure, and people can make up their minds from there."

The novel Two Girls, Fat and Thin follows the childhood and adult lives of Justine Shade (thin) and Dorothy Never (fat).  Justine works through her sadomasochistic issues while Dorothy works through her up-and-down commitment to the philosophy of "Definitism" and its founder "Anna Granite" (thinly veiled satires of Objectivism and Ayn Rand).  When journalist Justine interviews Dorothy for an exposé of Definitism, an unusual relationship begins between the two women.  In an interview, Gaitskill discussed what she was trying to convey about Justine via her sadomasochistic impulses:

The novel The Mare, published in 2015, is written from the perspectives of several different characters. The primary characters are named Ginger and Velvet (short for Velveteen). Ginger is a middle-aged woman who meets Velvet, a young adolescent, through The Fresh Air Fund. Other characters whose perspectives are featured include Paul (Ginger's husband), Silvia (Velvet's mother), Dante (Velvet's younger brother), and Beverly (a horse trainer).

Gaitskill received the Arts and Letters Award in Literature from The American Academy of Arts and Letters in 2018. Gaitskill's other honors include a Guggenheim Fellowship in 2002 and a PEN/Faulkner Award nomination for Because They Wanted To in 1998. Veronica (2005) was a National Book Award nominee, as well as a National Book Critics Circle finalist for that year.  The book is centered on the narrator, a former fashion model and her friend Veronica who contracts AIDS.  Gaitskill mentioned working on the novel in a 1994 interview, but that same year she put it aside until 2001.  Writing of Veronica and Gaitskill's career in Harper's Magazine in March 2006, Wyatt Mason said:

Gaitskill's favorite writers have changed over time, as she noted in a 2005 interview, but one constant is the author Vladimir Nabokov, whose Lolita "will be on my ten favorites list until the end of my life." Another consistently named influence is Flannery O'Connor. Despite her well-known S/M themes, Gaitskill does not appear to consider the Marquis de Sade himself an influence, or at least not a literary one:  "I don't think much of Sade as a writer, although I enjoyed beating off to him as a child."

Bibliography
Bad Behavior (1988) (stories) 
Two Girls, Fat and Thin (1991) (novel) 
Because They Wanted To (1997) (stories) 
Veronica (2005) (novel, National Book Award Finalist) 
Don't Cry (2009) (stories) 
The Mare (2015) (novel) 
Somebody with a Little Hammer (2017) (essays) 
This Is Pleasure (2019) (novella) 
Lost Cat (2020, originally published in Granta in 2009) (memoir) ISBN 978-1911547808
The Devil's Treasure: A Book of Stories and Dreams (2021)

Awards

 Arts and Letters Award in Literature, The American Academy of Arts and Letters (2018).
 Cullman Research Fellowship at the New York Public Library (2010)
 Guggenheim Fellowship for fiction (2002)
 Hopwood Award

References

External links

 Author interview (2010) by Suzanne Warren at Narrative.com.
 
 Author interview (2005?) at failbetter.com.
 Author interview (2005) for Barnes & Noble's "Meet the Writers" website.  Includes lists of her current favorites in fiction and film.
 Article ("Mary, Mary, Less Contrary" by Emily Nussbaum) in New York Magazine (November 14, 2005 issue).
The March 2006 Harper's had a notable review of Veronica by Wyatt Mason that also covered Gaitskill's earlier work.  
At Slate.com, Mason called Veronica "the best book of fiction in recent memory."
 2006 Reading report, Gaitskill with Edna O'Brien at 92nd Street Y from BookishLove.net
 Author interview (2009) with Sheila Heti at The Believer.
 2009 BOMB Magazine interview of Mary Gaitskill by Matthew Sharpe 
"Woman to Woman: An Interview with Mary Gaitskill" (2011)  by Emily McLaughlin at Fiction Writers Review.

1954 births
20th-century American novelists
21st-century American novelists
American women short story writers
American women novelists
Living people
Writers from Lexington, Kentucky
University of Michigan alumni
MacDowell Colony fellows
20th-century American women writers
21st-century American women writers
BDSM writers
20th-century American short story writers
21st-century American short story writers
PEN/Faulkner Award for Fiction winners
Kentucky women writers
Novelists from Kentucky
Hopwood Award winners